The Khanate of Kokand (Khānneshin-e Khoqand,  Khoqand Khānligi) was a Central Asian polity in the Fergana Valley centred on the city of Kokand between 1709 and 1876. Its territory is today divided between Uzbekistan, Kyrgyzstan, Tajikistan, and Kazakhstan.

History
The Khanate of Kokand was established in 1709 when the Shaybanid emir Shahrukh, of the Ming Tribe of Uzbeks, declared independence from the Khanate of Bukhara, establishing a state in the eastern part of the Fergana Valley. He built a citadel as his capital in the small town of Kokand, thus starting the Khanate of Kokand. His son, Abdul Kahrim Bey, and grandson, Narbuta Bey, enlarged the citadel, but both were forced to submit as a protectorate, and pay tribute to, the Qing dynasty between 1774 and 1798.

Narbuta Bey’s son Alim was both ruthless and efficient. He hired a mercenary army of Ghalcha highlanders, and conquered the western half of the Fergana Valley, including Khujand and Tashkent. He was assassinated by his brother Umar in 1811. Umar's son, Mohammed Ali (Madali Khan), ascended to the throne in 1822 at the age of 12. During his reign, the Khanate of Kokand reached its greatest territorial extent. The Kokand Khanate also housed the Khojas of Kashgar like Jahangir Khoja. In 1841, the British officer Captain Arthur Conolly failed to persuade the various khanates to put aside their differences, in an attempt to counter the growing penetration of the Russian Empire into the area. In November 1841, Captain Conolly left Kokand for Bukhara in an ill-fated attempt to rescue fellow officer Colonel Charles Stoddart, and both were executed on 24 June 1842 by the order of Emir Nasrullah Khan of Bukhara.

Following this, Madali Khan, who had received Conolly in Kokand, and who had also sought an alliance with Russia, lost the trust of Nasrullah. The Emir, encouraged by the conspiratorial efforts of several influential figures in Kokand (including the commander in chief of its army), invaded the Khanate in 1842. Shortly thereafter he executed Madali Khan, his brother, and Omar Khan's widow, the famed poet Nodira. Madali Khan's cousin, Shir Ali, was installed as the Khan of Kokand in June 1842. Over the next two decades, the khanate was weakened by a bitter civil war, which was further exacerbated by Bukharan and Russian incursions. During this period, the Kyrgyz tribes also broke away, forming the  under the leadership of Ormon Khan. Shir Ali's son, Khudayar Khan, ruled from 1844 to 1858, from 1862 to 1863, and from 1865 to 1875. In the meantime, Russia was continuing its advance; on 29 June 1865 Tashkent was taken by the Russian troops of General Chernyayev; the loss of Khujand followed in 1867.

Shortly before the fall of Tashkent, Kokand’s best-known son, Yakub Beg, former lord of Tashkent, was sent by the then Khan of Kokand, Alimqul, to Kashgar, where the Hui Muslims were in revolt against the Chinese. When Alimqul was killed in 1865 during the battle with Russia for Tashkent, many Kokandian soldiers fled to join Yaqub Beg, helping him establish his dominion throughout the Tarim Basin, which lasted until 1877, when Qing reconquered the region.

The now powerless Khudayar Khan spent his energies improving his lavish palace. Western visitors were impressed by the city of 80,000 people, which contained some 600 mosques and 15 madrasahs. Insurrections against Russian rule and Khudayar’s oppressive taxes forced him into exile in 1875. He was succeeded by his son, Nasruddin Khan, whose anti-Russian stance provoked the annexation of Kokand (after six months of fierce fighting) by Generals Konstantin von Kaufman and Mikhail Skobelev. In January 1876, Tsar Alexander II stated that he had been forced to "... yield to the wishes of the Kokandi people to become Russian subjects." The Khanate of Kokand was declared abolished, and incorporated into the Fergana Oblast of Russian Turkestan.

Rulers of Kokand (1709-1876)

Sources:

See also
 List of Turkic dynasties and countries
 List of Sunni Muslim dynasties
 Emirate of Bukhara
 Khanate of Khiva

Notes

Citations

References

Beisembiev, T. K. Kokandskaia istoriografiia : Issledovanie po istochnikovedeniiu Srednei Azii XVIII-XIX vekov. Almaty, TOO "PrintS", 2009..
Beisembiev, T. K. "Annotated indices to the Kokand Chronicles". Tokyo: Research Institute for Languages and Cultures of Asia and Africa, Tokyo University of Foreign Studies. Studia Culturae Islamica. № 91, 2008..
Beisembiev, T. K. "The Life of Alimqul: A Native Chronicle of Nineteenth Century Central Asia". Published 2003. Routledge .
Beisembiev, T. K. "Ta'rikh-i SHakhrukhi" kak istoricheskii istochnik. Alma Ata: Nauka, 1987.
Beisembiev, T. K. "Legenda o proiskhozhdenii kokandskikh khanov kak istochnik po istorii ideologii v Srednei Azii (na materialakh sochinenii kokandskoi istoriografii)". Kazakhstan, Srednjaja i Tsentralnaia Azia v XVI-XVIII vv. Alma-ata, 1983.

Dubavitski, Victor and Bababekov, Khaydarbek, in S. Frederick Starr, ed., Ferghana Valley: The Heart of Central Asia.
Erkinov, Aftandil S. "Imitation of Timurids and Pseudo-Legitimation: On the origins of a manuscript anthology of poems dedicated to the Kokand ruler Muhammad Ali Khan (1822–1842)", GSAA Online Working Paper No. 5.
Erkinov, Aftandil S. "Les timourides, modeles de legitimite et les recueils poetiques de Kokand". Ecrit et culture en Asie centrale et dans le monde Turko-iranien, XIVe-XIXe siècles // Writing and Culture in Central Asia and in the Turko-Iranian World, 14th-19th Centuries. F.Richard, M.Szuppe (eds.), [Cahiers de Studia Iranica. 40]. Paris: AAEI, 2009.

Golden, Peter B. (2011), Central Asia in World History, Oxford University Press.

Howorth, Sir Henry Hoyle. History of the Mongols: From the 9th to the 19th Century, Volume 2, Issue 2, pp. 795–801,816-845. https://archive.org/details/p2historyofmongo02howouoft/page/784/mode/2up

"The Muslim World"; Part III, "The Last Great Muslim Empires": Translation and Adaptations by F.R.C. Bagley. (Originally published 1969). Brill Academic Publishers, .
Nalivkine, V. P. Histoire du Khanat de Khokand. Trad. A.Dozon. Paris, 1889.
Nalivkine, V. P. "Kratkaia istoria kokandskogo khanstva". Istoria Srednei Azii. A.I.Buldakov, S.A.Shumov, A.R.Andreev (eds.). Moskva, 2003.
OʻzME. Birinchi jild. Tashkent, 2000.
Roy, Olivier. (2007). "The New Central Asia: Geopolitics and the Birth of Nations". I.B.Tauris. 

Vakhidov, Sh.Kh. XIX-ХХ asr bāshlarida Qoqān khānligida tarikhnavislikning rivājlanishi. arikh fanlari doktori dissertatsiyasi. Tāshkent, 1998.

External links
 Uzbek tourist site
 unesco site

 
Turkic dynasties
1709 establishments in Asia
Subdivisions of the Russian Empire
1876 disestablishments
Former monarchies